Ramon Torras Figueras (Barcelona, December 22, 1942 – Coma-ruga May 30, 1965) was a Catalan Grand Prix motorcycle road racer from Spain.

Torras was born in Barcelona. His best year was 1965, when he finished in eighth place in the 250cc world championship.

Torras missed some races due to national service and was killed in 1965 when he crashed in heavy rain whilst riding his factory Bultaco at a race in Coma-ruga, Spain.

References 

1942 births
1965 deaths
Motorcycle racers from Catalonia
Spanish motorcycle racers
125cc World Championship riders
250cc World Championship riders
Motorcycle racers who died while racing
Sport deaths in Spain
Sportspeople from Barcelona